Murcott is a hamlet in Watford  civil parish, in Northamptonshire, approximately half a mile west of the village of Long Buckby.

External links

Villages in Northamptonshire
West Northamptonshire District